George Rankl (February 28, 1867 in Milwaukee, Wisconsin – ?) was a member of the Wisconsin State Assembly

Career
Rankl was elected to the Assembly in 1902. He was a Republican.

References

Politicians from Milwaukee
1867 births
Year of death missing
Republican Party members of the Wisconsin State Assembly